The cue sports competition at the 2009 World Games, including three-cushion billiards, nine-ball (a pool discipline) and snooker, took place from 22 to 26 July, at the Chung Cheng Martial Arts Stadium in Kaohsiung, Taiwan.

Medal table

Medals summary

References

 
2009 World Games
2009
World Games
Cue sports in Taiwan